Chronica Polonorum or Cronica Polonorum (Latin for Chronicle of the Poles) may refer to:

Gesta principum Polonorum (1112-1118), a medieval deeds narrative, by Gallus Anonymous
Chronica seu originale regum et principum Poloniae (1190-1208), a Latin history of Poland by Wincenty Kadłubek
Chronicle of Greater Poland (1377-1386), by Jan of Czarnków
Chronica Polonorum (1519), by Maciej Miechowita
Chronicon Polono-Silesiacum

See also
Kronika Polska (disambiguation) (Polish for Polish Chronicle)